Clepsis hissarica is a species of moth of the family Tortricidae. It is found in Tajikistan.

References

Moths described in 1963
Clepsis